Lowson Anne Collins, Lady Cullen (formerly Fraser; born 20 July 1951) is a former New Zealand politician of the Labour Party.

Early life and family
Collins was born in Napier on 20 July 1951, the daughter of Lowson and Brian Collins. She was educated at Napier Girls' High School, and went on to study at Massey University, graduating BEd in 1982. Following her first marriage she was known as Anne Fraser.

Parliamentary career

She held the seat at the subsequent  by less than 240 votes, and in 1989, her name officially reverted to her maiden name Anne Collins after she had separated from her husband. She retired from Parliament in 1990. The same year, she was awarded the New Zealand 1990 Commemoration Medal, and in 1993 she received the New Zealand Suffrage Centennial Medal.

She was married to former Deputy Prime Minister and Finance Minister, Michael Cullen until his death in 2021.

Notes

References
 

1951 births
Living people
People from Napier, New Zealand
People educated at Napier Girls' High School
Massey University alumni
New Zealand Labour Party MPs
Women members of the New Zealand House of Representatives
Members of the New Zealand House of Representatives
New Zealand MPs for North Island electorates
Recipients of the New Zealand Suffrage Centennial Medal 1993